The 2007–08 Detroit Red Wings season was the franchise's  76th season as the Red Wings and 82nd in the National Hockey League (NHL).  The team won their eleventh Central Division title, sixth Presidents' Trophy, fifth Clarence S. Campbell Bowl, and won the Stanley Cup as league champion for the fourth time in eleven years. The team finished first in the Central Division and first in the Western Conference for their 17th consecutive playoff appearance and began the playoffs versus the Nashville Predators. The team won the first two games of the series at home but lost the next two at Nashville. In response to these losses, head coach Mike Babcock replaced starting goaltender Dominik Hasek with Chris Osgood.  Osgood led the team to nine straight victories en route to a 14–4 record (and 16–6 overall team record) and a four games to two victory over the Pittsburgh Penguins in the 2008 Stanley Cup Finals.

Three Red Wings players represented the West at the 56th National Hockey League All-Star Game in Atlanta, Georgia.  Goaltender Chris Osgood along with defenceman Nicklas Lidstrom and center Pavel Datsyuk were starters in the game.  The Western Conference team was coached by Detroit Red Wings head coach Mike Babcock.

Regular season

The Red Wings had the best goaltending in the League, allowing only 179 goals (excluding five shootout goals).

Divisional standings

Conference standings

Schedule and results

October

Record: 10–2–1; Home: 5–1–0; Road: 5–1–1

November

Record: 7–4–1; Home: 5–1–0; Road: 2–3–1

December

Record: 12–2–1 ; Home: 6–1–1 ; Road: 6–1–0

January

Record: 9–2–1; Home: 4–1–1; Road: 5–1–0

February

Record: 4–8–2; Home: 1–4–0; Road: 3–4–2

March

Record: 10–2–1; Home: 7–1–1; Road: 3–1–0;

April

Record: 2–1–0 ; Home: 2–0–0 ; Road: 0–1–0

Green background indicates win.
Red background indicates regulation loss.
White background indicates overtime/shootout loss.

Playoffs
Detroit has not missed the post-season since 1989–90.  The 2007–08 season was their 17th consecutive playoff season.  The Detroit Red Wings ended the 2007–08 season as the first seed in the Western Conference.

Western Conference Quarter-finals: vs. Nashville Predators (8) 
Detroit wins series 4–2.

Western Conference Semi-finals: vs. Colorado Avalanche (6) 
Detroit wins series 4–0.

Western Conference Finals: vs. Dallas Stars (5) 
Detroit wins series 4–2

Stanley Cup Final vs. Pittsburgh Penguins (2) 
Detroit wins series 4–2

The Pittsburgh Penguins ranked 2nd in the Eastern Conference regular season. 

Detroit wins the Stanley Cup for the 11th time, and first since 2002

2008 National Hockey League All-Star Game 

The 2008 National Hockey League All-Star Game took place on January 27, 2008 at Philips Arena in Atlanta, Georgia. The Eastern Conference defeated the Western Conference 8-7. The following are Red Wings players who participated in the all-star game.

 Mike Babcock (Head Coach, Western Conference)
 Chris Osgood (Starting Goaltender, Western Conference)
 Niklas Lidstrom (Defense Starter, Western Conference)
 Pavel Datsyuk (Forward Starter, Western Conference)

Player statistics

Skaters
Note: GP = Games played; G = Goals; A = Assists; Pts = Points; +/- = Plus/Minus; PIM = Penalties in Minutes

Regular Season

Playoffs

Goaltenders

Note: GP = Games played; TOI = Time on ice (minutes); W = Wins; L = Losses; OT = Overtime/shootout losses; GA = Goals against; SO = Shutouts; Sv% = Save percentage; GAA = Goals against average
Regular season
Playoffs

Awards and records

Milestones

Transactions
The Red Wings have been involved in the following transactions during the 2007–08 season.

Free agents

Draft picks
Detroit's picks at the 2007 NHL Entry Draft in Columbus, Ohio.

Farm teams

Grand Rapids Griffins
The Grand Rapids Griffins remain Detroit's American Hockey League affiliate in 2007–08.

See also
2007–08 NHL season

References

Player stats: Detroit Red Wings player stats on espn.com
Game log: Detroit Red Wings game log on espn.com
Team standings: NHL standings on espn.com

Stanley Cup championship seasons
Detroit Red Wings seasons
Detroit
Western Conference (NHL) championship seasons
Detroit
Det
2007 in sports in Michigan
2008 in sports in Michigan
Presidents' Trophy seasons